Stripburger (established in 1992 by the Strip Core collective) started as an international art fanzine, thus becoming a pioneer of independent comics in Slovenia.

Nowadays it publishes an awarded alternative comics magazine featuring works by both Slovene and foreign comic authors, as well as stand-alone comic books, original Slovenian works and translations of alternative international comic books and graphic novels. Additionally, an important part of the magazine's activities is its focus on comics exhibitions and workshops.

Stripburger magazine 
The only Slovene alternative comics magazine features works by Slovene and foreign comic authors, together with news, reviews, interviews and reflections on the comics medium. In January 2001 the magazine won an award for the best fanzine at the International Festival of Comic Art in Angoulême.

Being multilingual (Slovenian and English), the magazine has developed into an important resource on the international (especially European) comic scene. Currently, two editions of the magazine are issued annually.

In its 25 years, Stripburger has featured more than 700 artists from more than 30 countries all around the world.

Stripburger special issues 
Occasionally, Stripburger also publishes special issues that focus on specific themes like ecology, sex, madness, anti-nazi, human rights, war, handicap and work.

Some of the best special issues:

Stripburek - comics from behind the rusty iron curtain (1997) - was set up as an Eastern European anthology, featuring comics from Serbia, Croatia, Bosnia and Slovenia.

Handyburger (1998) - publication about physical handicap made in cooperation with YHD association.

XXX(Strip)burger (1999)

Stripburek - comics from the other Europe (2001)

Madburger (2002) – comics questioning sanity and shattering the taboo called madness.

Warburger (2003)

Miniburger (2004) – dirty dozen and the lucky 13th (a box of 12 booklets in b&w and the 13th in full color)

Honey talks - comics inspired by painted beehive panels (2006) – collection of comics inspired by a form of Slovene folk art, namely painted beehive panels.

Greetings from Cartoonia: The Essential Guide of the Land of Comics (2009)  - result of international project in which artists from abroad were given the task of creating a portrait of Slovenia, while artists living in Slovenia were asked to make a portrait of the countries their foreign colleagues come from.

Workburger: custom made product with a flawless defect (2012) - collection of comics revolving around the topic of contemporary work.

Collections 
Varying in genre and expression, Stripburger's four collections include stand-alone comic books by different artists.

Republika Strip 
Collection of comic albums/books. It was established in 2002 to publish original Slovenian artists and their works.

Published artists: Andrej Štular, Ciril Horjak, Damijan Stepančič, Domen Finžgar, Gašper Rus, Grega Mastnak, Izar Lunaček, Iztok Sitar, Jakob Klemenčič, Kaja Avberšek, Marijan Pušavec (script writer), Marko Kociper, Matej de Cecco, Matej Kocjan - Koco, Matej Lavrenčič, Matej Stupica, Miha Mazzini, Tomaž Lavrič, Vinko Möderndorfer (writer of short stories after which the comics in the Deveta soba collection were made).

Ambasada Strip 
This collection, established in 2006, aims to present world-class comics by foreign artists to Slovenian audience.

Published artists: Claudio Piersanti (script), Daniel Clowes, Dave Cooper, David B., Gipi, Gunnar Lundkvist, Helena Klakočar, Jacques Tardi, Joann Sfar, Julie Doucet, Kim Deich, Lars Fiske, Lorenzo Mattotti, Marcel Ruijters, Matthias Lehmann, Max Andersson, Nicolas Presl, Posy Simmonds, Riad Sattouf, Simon Deitch.

Minimundus 
Comic works for young readers and experimental works. Most of them are in Slovene, though some Minimudus pieces also come as bilingual.

Published artists: Andrej Štular, Boštjan Gorenc (script), David Krančan, Francesco Satta (script), Jakob Klemenčič, Kaja Avberšek, Manka Kremenšek Križman, Marjan Manček, Matej de Cecco, Matej Kocjan - Koco, Matej Lavrenčič, Matjaž Schmidt, Miha Hančič, Peter Kus (script), Sara Colaone, Saša Kerkoš, Tanja Komadina.

O Editions 
Various experimental projects (bordering on poetry, music etc.) or books that can not be labeled are done under the O editions.

Awards 
Best fanzine/alternative 2001 (International Festival of Comic Art in Angoulême, January 2001)

Golden Pear 2012 (for Marjan Manček: Hribci Kremeniti, Ljubljana city library )

Muriel honorary award 2014 (KomiksFEST! in Prague, November 2014)

The white ravens 2015 (for Tanja Komadina: Fino kolo, Internationale Jugendbibliothek München, October 2015)

Best comic book design 2015 (for David Krančan: Pijani zajec, Slovenian book fair, November 2015)

Editorial board

Current 
Katerina Mirović (1992 -)

David Krančan (2002 -)

Domen Finžgar (2009 -)

Bojan Albahari (2009 -)

Kaja Avberšek (2009 -)

Tanja Skale (2013 -)

Ana Bogataj (2016 -)

Former 
Strip Core: Samo Ljubešić, Jani Mujić, Božo Rakočević, Dare Kuhar, Katerina Mirović (1992)

Boris Bačić (1992 - 2001)

Jakob Klemenčič (1992, 1994 - 1999, 2007 - 2008)

Matjaž Bertoncelj (1995 - 2000)

Igor Prassel (1995 - 2006)

Matej Kocjan - Koco (1998 - 2004)

Olmo Omerzu (2001 - 2002)

Ivan Mitrevski (2002 - 2006)

Žiga Aljaž (2002 - 2004)

Matej de Cecco (2005 - 2007)

Gašper Rus (2006 - 2010)

Tea Hvala (2007 - 2008)

Consulting editor for special issues: Robert Boyd

Shadow editors: Dani Kavaš, Tomaž Gorkič

Timeline

Exhibitions and collaborations 
Stripburger has always been an internationally oriented collective, with frequent exhibitions around Europe and also Russia. In recent years, it visited Maison de la Culture de le Tournai (BE), L’An Vert, Liege (BE), Helsinki Comics Festival, Galerija SC (HR), Nextcomics Festival (AT), KomiksFEST! (CZ), Treviso Comic Book Festivalu (IT), Le Garage L. (FR), The Millionaires Club (TMC) (DE), Galerie 1er degre (DE), etc.

Underground and Above the Clouds 
In collaboration with the Vžigalica Gallery, City Museum of Ljubljana, and KUD France Prešeren Gallery, Stripburger celebrated its 18th birthday in 2010 with exhibitions, lectures, comic workshops, and with the première of the animated film Stripburger in Motion [Stripburger v gibanju, directed by Boris Dolenc, prod.: Forum Ljubljana, coprod.: Invida] in Kinodvor Cinema.

Honey talks 
Stripburger collaborated with the Slovene Ethnographic Museum, which in 2006 hosted the widely acclaimed anthology Honey Talks – comics inspired by painted beehive panels reinterpreting the 19th-century folk art with works by 12 international comics artists (Marcel Ruijters, Milorad Krstić, Jakob Klemenčič, Koco, Anke Feuchtenberger, Vladan Nikolić, Matthias Lehmann, Rutu Modan, Danijel Žeželj...). The exhibition included original comics, modern interpretations of beehive panels, beehive panel replicas and animated movie by Matej Lavrenčič (A Huntsman and a funeral).

Greetings from Cartoonia 
In 2009, Stripburger produced the international exhibition "Greetings from Cartoonia" in Slovene Ethnographic Museum to complement the special issue, an anthology, of the same name. It was made in collaboration with 6 European comic associations - Dongery (Norway), Chili Com Carne (Portugal), Fundacja Transmisja (Poland), The Finnish Comics Society (Finland), Hardcomics (Romania) and Vivacomix (Italy).

Afterwards, the exhibition was shown at Festival Internacional de BD de Beja, Portugal (2010), in La Zone Cultural centre in Liege, Belgium (2011) and at the Anim'est, International Festival of Animated Film in Bucharest, Romania (2011), Linz, Austria...

Attention, Work! 
The "Attention, Work!" exhibition accompanied the Workburger special issue, featuring about 50 comics artists from all over the world. It was opened in November 2013 at The Coal Mining Museum of Slovenia.

It was also presented at Slovene ethnographic museum in Ljubljana, The Millionaires Club comics & graphics festival in Leipzig, Germany, Le Garage L. in Forcalquier, France, Treviso Comic Book Festival in Italy, KomiksFEST! in Prague, Czech Republic (2014), Biblioteca Civica del Comune di Pordenone in Pordenone, Italy, Nextcomic Festival in Steyr, Austria, 30th Helsinki Comics Festival in Finland, Gallery SC in Zagreb, Croatia (2015), L'An Vert, Le Cercle du Laveu, Le Comptoir in Liege, Belgium, Institut Saint-Luc Tournai, Maison de la Culture de le Tournai in Tournai, Belgium, Stockholm International Comics Festival, Sweden, Tenderete Festival in Valencia, Spain, AltCom 2016 in Malmö, Sweden (2016), Gutter fest in Barcelona, Spain and Oslo comics expo, Norway (2017).

Tinta festival 
In October 2017 Stripburger co-produced Tinta comics festival together with Kino Šiška, Zavod Stripolis, Radio Študent, Strip.art.nica Buch/Zavod Strip art and VigeVageKnjige.

Education 
Stripburger holds different workshops and competitions to promote comics culture with younger readers.

Viva i Fumetti! / Živel strip! 
An important Stripburger activity is the Viva i Fumetti! / Živel strip! (Long live comics!) comics-making competition, running since 2005 in collaboration with the Italian Vivacomix association, who was an initiator of the project. It is aimed at primary and high school students from the Friuli-Venezia Giulia region of Italy and Slovenia.

References

Fanzines
Magazines published in Slovenia